Mapoteng is a community council located in the Berea District of Lesotho. Its population in 2006 was 23,926.

Villages
The community of Mapoteng includes the villages of:

BorakapaneBotsoapaHa 'MakhoroanaHa AroneHa FiloaneHa HlakolaneHa Jobo (Mapoteng)Ha Khotso (Mapoteng)Ha LebenyaHa LehomoHa Macha (Mapoteng)Ha MafamolaneHa MahlomolaHa MakhobaloHa Makoetje (Lefikeng)Ha Malima (Mapoteng)Ha Maloela (Mapoteng)Ha Malothoane (Lefikeng)Ha MatubeHa MohapiHa MokhachaneHa MokhobokoaneHa MokoneHa Molebo (Mapoteng)Ha MoqachelaHa MorasenyaneHa MosenyaHa MoshakhaHa MotjoliHa MpesheHa Mphanya (Mapoteng)
Ha MphatsoanyaneHa NthobaHa NtinaHa NtsosoHa PhalimaHa PitsoHa PotjoHa QhobosheaneHa RachereHa Ramaema (Mapoteng)Ha RamakoroHa RamohoeteHa SabaHa SekhahlelaHa Sekhomo (Mapoteng)Ha Selebeli (Nokong)Ha TebaleteHa TsepeHa WeetoKelekeqeKhethaKhohlongKoma-KomaLeboteng (Ha Telebate)LekhalongLibakhaLifotholengLikoting (Mapoteng)MachoabolengMakoabatingMampating
MapolatengMarena MangataMasaleng (Ha Khomo-Ea-Leburu)MasenkengMasetlaokongMatlapeng (Ha Ntina)Mokoallong (Mapoteng)Mothoba-PeloNokongNtšireleNyarelengPaballongPhalolePhuthaPopopo (Mapoteng)SehlabengSehlabeng (Lefikeng)SekhutlongSekotjanengSentelinaTaungTaung (Mapoteng)Taung (Nokong)Thaba-ChitjaThabana-TšooanaThabong (Mapoteng)Thota-Tsehla (Mapoteng)Thoteng (Nokong)Tlokong (Ha Nthoba)Tsatsa-Le-MoeaTsokung

Healthcare
Maluti Adventist Hospital, established in 1951, is a 150-bed hospital.

References

External links
 Google map of community villages

Populated places in Berea District